The 2013 Hungarian Figure Skating Championships took place on 21–22 December 2012 in Budapest. Skaters competed in the disciplines of men's singles, ladies' singles, and ice dancing on the senior, junior, and novice levels. The results were used to choose the Hungarian teams to the 2013 World Championships and the 2013 European Championships.

Senior results

Men

Ladies

Ice dancing

External links
 info
 results

Hungarian Figure Skating Championships
Hungarian Figure Skating Championships, 2012
Hungarian Figure Skating